DDT 10th Anniversary: Judgement 2007 was a double professional wrestling event promoted by DDT Pro-Wrestling (DDT). It took place on March 11, 2007, in Tokyo, Japan, at the Kitazawa Town Hall. The event was split into two events: DDT 10th Anniversary: Judgement 2007 (the eleventh event under the Judgement name) and Judgement Anniversary Special. Both events aired domestically on Fighting TV Samurai.

Storylines
Judgement 2007 and Judgement Anniversary Special featured twelve professional wrestling matches that involved different wrestlers from pre-existing scripted feuds and storylines. Wrestlers portrayed villains, heroes, or less distinguishable characters in the scripted events that built tension and culminated in a wrestling match or series of matches.

Event

DDT 10th Anniversary: Judgement 2007

The four-way tag team match was a battle between DDT brands. Yusuke Inokuma and Gorgeous Matsuno represented DDT, Mikami and Susumu represented Cruiser's-Game, Isami and 726 represented Union Pro Wrestling and Cho-un Shiryu and Norikazu Fujioka represented Muscle.

Judgement Anniversary Special
Opening the show was a video segment showing Naoshi Sano winning the Ironman Heavymetalweight Championship from Senpai, thus becoming the 669th champion.

The first match was the final of the Wrestling Koshien 2007 tournament held by the DDT New Attitude (DNA) sub-brand.

The third match was the "5 Minute + α Minute Limitless Battle Royal", a Championship Scramble for the Ironman Heavymetalweight Championship in which there were no interim champions but rather actual title changes because of the 24/7 rule of the championship. After twenty-three title changes, Exciting Yoshida was the winner and became the 692nd champion.

Between the fourth and fifth matches, a ladder fell on Yoshida, pinning him and becoming the 693rd champion. This was the ladder's third reign as a champion.

Results

DDT 10th Anniversary: Judgement 2007

Judgement Anniversary Special

5 Minute + α Minute Limitless Battle Royal Ironman Heavymetalweight Champions

References

External links
The official DDT Pro-Wrestling website

2007
2007 in professional wrestling
Professional wrestling in Tokyo